Eramudugolla may refer to:

 Eramudugolla (7°15'N 80°40'E), a village in Sri Lanka
 Eramudugolla (7°31'N 80°35'E), a village in Sri Lanka